Stanley Jean-Baptiste (born April 12, 1990) is a former professional gridiron football defensive back. He was drafted by the New Orleans Saints in the second round of the 2014 NFL Draft. He played college football at Nebraska.

Early years
Jean-Baptiste, the son of Haitian immigrant parents, attended Westlake Preparatory School in Davie, Florida, where he played football, basketball and ran track for coach Michael Tunsil. In football, he played wide receiver. As a senior, he had 21 catches for 569 yards and seven touchdowns through the first five games of the season. Defensively, as a safety, he had six interceptions and two touchdowns. In track, he competed in sprints and jumps and recorded times of 11.4 in the 100m and 23.3 in the 200m. Following high school, Jean-Baptiste spent one year at North Carolina Tech Christian Academy, totaling 36 receptions for 580 yards in 2008.

College career
Jean-Baptiste played safety and wide receiver while at Fort Scott Community College in his redshirted season. He signed with the University of Nebraska following the season. He finished college with a total of 74 tackles, 7 interceptions, 22 pass deflections and one sack, and was named second-team All-Big Ten after recording 41 tackles, 12 pass breakups and four interceptions in his senior season.

Professional career
On December 30, 2013, it was reported that Jean-Baptiste had accepted his invitation to play in the 2014 Senior Bowl. On January 25, 2014, Jean-Baptiste recorded five combined tackles in the Senior Bowl playing as a part of Atlanta Falcons' head coach Mike Smith's North team that loss to the South 20–10.
 
The New Orleans Saints selected Jean-Baptiste in the second round (58th overall) of the 2014 NFL Draft. He was the sixth cornerback selected in 2014.

New Orleans Saints
On May 18, 2014, the New Orleans Saints signed Jean-Baptiste to a four-year, $3.57 million contract and a signing bonus of $970,000.

Baptiste played in only four games during his rookie year with the Saints, almost entirely on special teams.

On September 3, 2015, Jean-Baptiste was constantly beaten in coverage during the Saints' 38–10 loss to the Green Bay Packers in their last preseason game. He was scolded by head coach Sean Payton on the sideline and was released two days later on September 5, 2015.

Detroit Lions
On September 6, 2015, Jean-Baptiste cleared waivers. Later that afternoon, he was signed to Detroit Lions practice squad after refusing offers from several other teams. He was cut by the Lions on December 15.

Seattle Seahawks
On December 17, 2015, Jean-Baptiste was signed to the Seattle Seahawks practice squad.

Kansas City Chiefs
On May 9, 2017, Jean-Baptiste was signed by the Kansas City Chiefs. He was waived on June 15, 2017.

Jacksonville Jaguars
On July 25, 2017, Jean-Baptiste signed with the Jacksonville Jaguars. He was waived on September 2, 2017 and was re-signed to the practice squad. He was released on September 12, 2017.

Baltimore Ravens
On October 3, 2017, Jean-Baptiste was signed to the Baltimore Ravens' practice squad. He was promoted to the active roster on December 5, 2017.

On August 31, 2018, Jean-Baptiste was placed on injured reserve after suffering a broken arm in the final preseason game.

On March 26, 2019, Jean-Baptiste re-signed with the Ravens. He was released on August 31, 2019.

Toronto Argonauts
On January 21, 2020, Jean-Baptiste signed a three-year contract with Toronto Argonauts. After the CFL canceled the 2020 season due to the COVID-19 pandemic, Jean-Baptiste chose to opt-out of his contract with the Argonauts on September 3, 2020.

Statistics
Source: NFL.com

References

External links
Toronto Argonauts bio
New Orleans Saints bio
Nebraska Cornhuskers bio

Living people
1990 births
Miami Central Senior High School alumni
Players of American football from Miami
American sportspeople of Haitian descent
American football cornerbacks
Nebraska Cornhuskers football players
New Orleans Saints players
Detroit Lions players
Seattle Seahawks players
Kansas City Chiefs players
Jacksonville Jaguars players
Baltimore Ravens players
Toronto Argonauts players
Players of Canadian football from Miami